Parliamentary elections were held in Burkina Faso on 2 December 2012. They were the first elections held since the National Assembly dissolved the National Electoral Commission in 2011, following fraud allegations concerning the 2010 presidential elections.  Municipal elections for over 18,000 councillors were held simultaneously. The elections were held amidst a period of political uncertainty, following protests against President Blaise Compaore's regime.

The result was a victory for the ruling Congress for Democracy and Progress (CDP), which won 70 of the 127 seats in the National Assembly.

Background
The 2010 presidential elections were criticized by opposition leaders and independent observers for various missteps in democratic practice. Reported issues included the inappropriate influence of traditional leaders, ballot and voting card shortages at polling stations, inaccurate electoral lists and a misappropriation of resources by the state for Compaore's re-election campaign.

Electoral system
The 127 members of the National Assembly were elected for five-year terms, of which 111 were elected in 45 multi-member constituencies ranging in size from two to nine seats, with the remaining 16 elected in a single nationwide constituency. The elections were conducted using closed list proportional representation. Individual candidates won seats based on their position on the party list, the order of which was decided by each party’s leadership.

Opposition parties criticized the government's inability to reliably determine voter eligibility. In response, the government created a biometric voter identification system, and the National Assembly dissolved the existent Electoral Commission. Pryce and Nascimento noted that these steps, along with government campaigns to encourage women's involvement in politics, mark a movement towards sounder political practices in Burkina Faso.

Campaign
Around 3,000 candidates ran in the 45 provincial constituencies, with 74 parties and electoral alliances competed for the 16 national seats.

The CDP was supported by the Alliance for Democracy and Federation – African Democratic Rally, which was still considered an opposition party. The Union for Progress and Change (UPC), formed by a CDP defector, gained attention as a possible challenger to the CDP prior to the election as it protested  he party's attempts to lengthen President Compaore’s term via a constitutional amendment that aimed to remove presidential term limits.

Other minor parties emphasized ideological connections to Thomas Sankara, Compaore's predecessor, with four parties considering themselves Sankarist, including the National Council for Rebirth–Sankarist Movement, Pan-African Union for Sankarism–Progressive Movement, Union for Democratic Rebirth–Sankarist Movement and the Union for Rebirth / Sankarist Movement.

Conduct
According to domestic and international observers, efficiency and legitimacy improved in the 2012 elections after the government introduced electoral reforms, though opposition forces claimed the ruling party used state resources in its campaign. The elections were observed by 37 parties, all from 21 members of the African Union. There were also a small number of domestic observers, most associated with non-partisan non-governmental organizations, including the Centre for Democratic Governance and the Independent Observatory of Elections.

Bernard Makuza, head of the African Union electoral observer mission, declared the elections free and fair, though he decried public apathy toward the elections, especially in the cities. However, the UPC claimed there was vote rigging in Kadiogo Province, following a delay in reporting ballot counts. UPC campaign director Nathaneal Ouedrego declared his intention to "give proof of fraud and irregularities in Kadiogo in the next days in order to demand pure and simply the cancellation of elections in that province".

Results
Just under 76% of eligible voters participated in the elections, the highest turnout since multi-party politics was reintroduced in 2002, possibly due to the perceived viability of opposition to the CDP. Support in some electoral districts shifted from the CDP to the UPC, leading to a notable decrease in the CDP's popular vote count, although it only lost three seats. The UPC secured as many votes as the ADF–RDA, and more votes than any other opposition party. Overall, thirteen parties won seats.

References

Elections in Burkina Faso
Burkina Faso
2012 in Burkina Faso
December 2012 events in Africa